This article contains information about the literary events and publications of 1705.

Events
April/May – Richard Steele, having left the army, marries a wealthy widow, Margaret Stretch.
July 29 – Richard Challoner enters the English College, Douai.
October 7 – William Somervile inherits his father's estate, where field sports will inspire much of his poetry.
October 30 – John Vanbrugh's play The Confederacy, adapted from the French, is first performed at his new London playhouse, The Queen's Theatre in the Haymarket.
December 27 – John Vanbrugh's play The Mistake is likewise adapted from the French and first performed at The Queen's Theatre.
unknown dates
George Hickes' Linguarum veterum septentrionalium thesaurus grammatico-criticus et archæologicus vol. 2 (published in Oxford) includes the first published reference to Beowulf and the single surviving transcript of the Finnesburg Fragment.
Chikamatsu Monzaemon (近松門左衛門) almost abandons writing kabuki plays and becomes a staff writer to the bunraku theatre in Osaka.
Claude Pierre Goujet, religious historian and Jansenist, enters holy orders.
William Walsh begins a correspondence with Alexander Pope.
Work begins on Blenheim Palace in Oxfordshire, England, designed by the playwright John Vanbrugh for the Duke of Marlborough.

New books

Prose
Joseph Addison – Remarks on Several Parts of Italy
Mary Astell – The Christian Religion as Profess'd by a Daughter of the Church
Dimitrie Cantemir – Historia Hieroglyphica (the first novel to use the Romanian language)
George Cheyne – Philosophical Principles of Natural Religion (deist)
Samuel Clarke – A Demonstration of the Being and Attributes of God
Mary Davys – The Fugitive
Daniel Defoe
The Consolidator; or, Memoirs of Sundry Transactions from the World in the Moon
A Second Volume of the Writings of the Author of the True-Born Englishman
John Dunton – The Life and Errors of John Dunton Late Citizen of London (humor)
Edmund Gibson – Family-Devotion
Charles Gildon – The Deist's Manual
Marie-Jeanne L'Héritier – La Tour ténébreuse, et les jours lumineux: contes anglois
Bernard de Mandeville – The Grumbling Hive (pirated edition)
Delarivière Manley – The Secret History, of Queen Zarah, and the Zarazians (roman à clef)
John Philips
Blenheim
The Splendid Shilling
Katherine Philips – Letters of Orinda to Poliarchus
John Toland – Primitive Constitution of the Christian Church

Drama
Thomas Baker – Hampstead Heath
Susannah Centlivre
The Gamester (anonymously)
The Basset-Table
Colley Cibber – The Careless Husband
Prosper Jolyot de Crébillon – Idoménée
John Dennis – Gibraltar, or the Spanish Adventure
George Granville – The British Enchanters
William Grimston, 1st Viscount Grimston – The Lawyer’s Fortune or Love in a Hollow Tree
Peter Anthony Motteux
The Amorous Miser, or the Younger the Wiser
Arsinoe, Queen of Cyprus (opera)
William Mountfort – Zelmane
Mary Pix (attributed) – The Conquest of Spain (adapted from William Rowley's All's Lost by Lust)
 Nicholas Rowe – Ulysses
Richard Steele – The Tender Husband
John Vanbrugh – 
 The Confederacy
 The Mistake

Poetry
Richard Blackmore – Eliza
Daniel Defoe 
The Double Welcome
The Dyet of Poland
Quan Tangshi
Charles Johnson – The Queen; a Pindaric Ode
Matthew Prior – An English Padlock
Ned Ward – Hudibras Redidivus
Isaac Watts – Horae Lyricae
See also 1705 in poetry

Births
January 21 – Isaac Hawkins Browne, English poet (died 1760)
February 13 – Franciszka Urszula Radziwillowa, Polish dramatist (died 1753)
May – Ambrosius Stub, Danish poet (died 1758)
June 21 – David Hartley, English philosopher (died 1757)
September 2 – Abraham Tucker (Edward Search), English philosopher (died 1774)
October 29 – Gerhardt Friedrich Müller, German historian (died 1783)
November 23 – Thomas Birch, English historian (died 1766)
probable – Stephen Duck, English poet (died 1756)

Deaths
January 4 – Madame d'Aulnoy, French author of fairy tales (born c. 1650)
January 10 – Étienne Pavillon, French lawyer and poet (born 1632)
February 5 – Philipp Jakob Spener, German theologian (born 1635)
April 2 – John Howe, English theologian (born 1630)
May 5 – Johann Ernst Glück, German writer and translator (born 1654)
June 10 – Michael Wigglesworth, English poet (born 1631)
October 17 – Ninon de l'Enclos, French courtesan and salonnière (born 1620)
November 10 – Justine Siegemund, German writer on midwifery (born 1636)

References

 
Years of the 18th century in literature